In geometric topology, a wild arc is an embedding of the unit interval into 3-dimensional space not equivalent to the usual one in the sense that there does not exist an ambient isotopy taking the arc to a straight line segment.   found the first example of a wild arc,  and  found another example called the Fox-Artin arc whose complement is not simply connected.

See also
Wild knot
Horned sphere

Further reading

 

Geometric topology